Hugh Luttrell may refer to:

 Hugh Luttrell (Liberal politician) (1857–1918), British Liberal Party politician
 Sir Hugh Luttrell (c. 1364 – 1428), English nobleman and politician during the Hundred Years' War